Shaad Ali is an Indian filmmaker.

Early life and education
Ali was born to Muzaffar Ali and Subhashini Ali (née Sahgal), an Indian politician and member of the Communist Party of India (Marxist). He is thus the grandson of Azad Hind Fauj commander Lakshmi Sahgal. He studied at the Welham Boys' School and the Lawrence School, Sanawar.

Career
Shaad Ali started his career as an assistant director to Mani Ratnam, and assisted him on the film Dil Se.. (1998).

He made his directorial debut under Yash Raj Films and Madras Talkies, with Saathiya (2002), starring Vivek Oberoi and Rani Mukerji. The film was a remake of Mani Ratnam's Tamil film Alaipayuthey (2000). Saathiya's script was written by Ratnam. The film did well and established Shaad Ali in the industry.

His second film was Bunty Aur Babli (2005) which for the first time brought together real-life father and son Amitabh Bachchan and  Abhishek Bachchan alongside Rani Mukerji. The film was one of the biggest hits of the year.

Shaad Ali's third film released on 15 June 2007. The film, titled Jhoom Barabar Jhoom stars Abhishek Bachchan, Preity Zinta, Bobby Deol and Lara Dutta in lead roles.

His fourth directorial venture was Kill Dil which got released on 14 November 2014. The movie received average reviews from critics and got lukewarm response at the Box office as well.

He has directed movie Ok Jaanu which released on 13 January 2017. Ok Jaanu is a remake of a Tamil movie Mani Ratnam's O Kadhal Kanmani. This film reunited him with composer A. R. Rahman after a long hiatus since Saathiya (2002), after Rahman turned down Bunty Aur Babli citing a busy schedule.

His latest movie is Soorma which is a biographical sports drama film based on the life of hockey player Sandeep Singh releasing on 13 July 2018.

Personal life
Ali married Shazmeen Hussain, daughter of conceptual artist Rummana Hussain and businessman Ishaat Hussain, in 2006 but they divorced in 2011. He briefly dated Puja Shetty, daughter of Adlabs founder Manmohan Shetty. In 2013, he married Aarti Patkar.

He’s the grandson of the Captain Lakshmi Sahgal and Colonel Prem Sahgal. Ali is the nephew of environmental educator Kartikeya Sarabhai and the Indian classical dancer Mallika Sarabhai.

Filmography

Web series 

 Pawan & Pooja (2020)
 Call My Agent: Bollywood (2021)
 Bloody Brothers (2022)

References

External links 
 

Film directors from Kolkata
People from Lakhimpur Kheri
Politicians from Kolkata
Living people
Lawrence School, Sanawar alumni
Communist Party of India (Marxist) politicians from West Bengal
21st-century Indian film directors
1970 births